Francis Alÿs (born 1959, Antwerp) is a Belgian-born, Mexico-based artist.

His work emerges in the interdisciplinary space of art, architecture, and social practice. In 1986, Alÿs left behind his profession as an architect and relocated to Mexico City.

He has created a diverse body of artwork and performance art that explores urban tensions and geopolitics. Employing a broad range of media, from painting to performance, his works examine the tension between politics and poetics, individual action and impotence. Alÿs commonly enacts paseos—walks that resist the subjection of common space. Cyclical repetition and mechanics of progression and regression also inform the character of Alÿs' actions and mythology—Alÿs contrasts geological and technological time through land-based and social practice that examine individual memory and collective mythology. Alÿs frequently engages rumor as a central tool in his practice, disseminating ephemeral, practice-based works through word-of-mouth and storytelling.

Work 
Alÿs' body of works encompasses many media. Whereas in the earlier years the actions were mostly performed by the artist himself, over the past decade children have become the main protagonists of his projects. These public actions are documented in video, installations, paintings, and drawings. Throughout his practice, Francis Alÿs consistently directs his distinct poetic and imaginative sensibility toward anthropological and geopolitical concerns centered around observations of, and engagements with, everyday life, which the artist himself has described as "a sort of discursive argument composed of episodes, metaphors, or parables."

Actions 
Many of his works involve intense observation and recording of the social, cultural and economic fabric of specific locations, commonly taking place during walks through urban areas. Citing the act of walking as the centre of his practice, for his first performance The Collector (1991), he dragged a small magnetic toy dog on wheels throughout the streets of Mexico City so as to collect any metallic residue lying in its path. In Fairy Tales (1995), he takes a walk after unravelling the sweater he has on, leaving an ever-lengthening, blue-thread trail in his wake. Also in 1995, Alÿs realized an action in São Paulo called The Leak in which he walked from a gallery, around the city, and back into the gallery trailing a dribbled line from an open can of blue paint. This action was reprised in 2004 when Alÿs traced a line of paint following the 1948 cease-fire border in Jerusalem, known as 'the green line', carrying a can filled with green paint. The bottom of the can was perforated with a small hole, so the paint dripped out as a continuous squiggly line on the ground as he walked. The work Paradox of Praxis 1 (Sometimes Making Something Leads to Nothing) documents an action performed on the streets of Mexico City in 1997. The film depicts a simple and seemingly pointless endeavour—a large block of ice being pushed through the city streets for nine hours until it melts away to a puddle of meltwater.

The Rehearsal (1999) consists of a 30 min static take of a red VW Beetle driving up the slope of a dirt road in a shantytown of Tijuana while the viewer hears musicians rehearsing a song. Every time they stop playing, the car rolls backwards down the hill, as if running out of petrol, but when the music starts up again, the car starts driving up the hill once more.

In Tornado (2000-2010), spliced film clips show Alÿs chasing after huge dust devils kicked up by the annual dry season in central Mexico. Kara L. Rooney writes of the piece in The Brooklyn Rail, "The sight of his lean frame racing towards the twisters is at once ridiculous and hysterical—blithe qualities that quickly give way to gravitas as the artist physically enters the eye of the storm. Inside, chaos reigns and Alÿs, unprotected except for his handheld camera, is enveloped and pummeled by flying bits of sand, dust and dirt."

In his best-known work, When Faith Moves Mountains (2002), Alÿs recruited 500 volunteers in Ventanilla District outside of Lima, Peru. The participants were equipped with shovels and, forming a single line, they moved their shovel full of sand one step at a time from one side of a dune to the other, and together they displaced by a few inches the 500 mt long sand dune from its original position. Art critic Jean Fisher writes that "the radical event of art precipitates a crisis of meaning or, rather, it exposes the void of meaning at the core of a given social situation, which is its truth."

Between 2004 and 2005 Alÿs collaborated with Artangel on several projects regrouped under the title of Seven Walks. In one of them, The Nightwatch (2004), a wild fox called Bandit was set free in the National Portrait Gallery while it's wanderings were filmed by the surveillance cameras of the museum.

In the project Don't Cross the Bridge Before You Get to the River (2008), a line of kids with shoe boats leaves Europe towards Morocco while a line of kids with shoe boats leaves Africa towards Spain, with the 2 lines eventually meeting on the horizon. As in many of Alÿs' video projects, his collaborators were Rafael Ortega, Julien Devaux, Felix Blume and Ivan Boccara.

For Manifesta 10 in St. Petersburg, Alÿs contributed with Lada Kopeika Project (2014), a "road trip" that concludes with the Lada car crashing into a tree in the courtyard of the Hermitage. The Silence of Ani was realized in 2015 with a group of teenagers of Kars, Turkey. It takes place on the present Turkish-Armenian border in the once Armenian City of Ani which, after centuries of successive invasions and sackings, lies today in a state of total abandon and decay. Alÿs gave instruments to imitate birds—birdcalls—to the teenagers, they entered the city walls and, hiding in the rubbles, called the birds to create the illusion that the city was coming back to life.

Painting 
"I was profoundly under the spell of pre-Renaissance painting during my years of university in Italy: from Lorenzetti to Fra Angelico. Even to this day, my iconography is a combination of that imagery and the language of Mexican sign painting. This blend allowed me to find a personal way of materializing images. I've never been that interested in a painterly style. My images are most often mentally resolved— 'imagined'—by the time they make it to the canvas."

In the early nineties, Alÿs collaborated with Mexican sign-painters ("rotulistas") to paint enlarged and elaborated versions of his small paintings, which they were invited to reproduce at their own taste. The generic name of this project was The Liar, the Copy of the Liar (1997). His intention is to challenge the idea of the original artwork, rendering the process of making more anonymous and deflating the perceived commercial value of art.

The paintings of the series Le temps du sommeil were begun in 1996 and often worked on at night. They feature visionary dreamlike scenes involving tiny suited men and women acting out strange rituals reminiscent of children's games and gymnastic experiments. Many of these images anticipate and recall the forms he has employed in his actions, but the paintings connect to his actions in other ways too since their surfaces are worked and re-worked. The fact that the images are never final but rather are palimpsests, suggests the deep connection between figurative painting and action art that lies at the heart of Alÿs' work.

"What justifies my recourse to painting is that it's the shortest way—or sometimes the only way—to translate certain scenarios or situations that cannot be said, that cannot be filmed or performed. It's about entering a situation that could not exist elsewhere, only on the paper or canvas. [...] Also, painting allows me to retreat from the sometimes hectic rhythm of the performances and film productions, and to distance myself without losing contact with them. [...] When I am translating an ongoing film plot into an image, I'll try to create an image that reflects the intention behind the plot rather than illustrating the facts of the film. It functions more like a correspondence, a pendant."

The Fabiola Project 
Since 1994, Alÿs has been collecting copies of Jean-Jacques Henner's painting of Fabiola, a fourth-century patrician Roman woman who, despite divorce and remarriage, did such fervent penance that she was welcomed back to the faith and, after her death, sainted. Through a novel written by Cardinal Wiseman, Fabiola regained popularity in the middle of the nineteen century. Alÿs acquired copies of Fabiola portraits painted by of amateurs in flea markets and antiques stores, in places as various as Mexico, Chile, Brazil, Holland, Germany, Lebanon and Russia. The paintings have been left in their original state. The artists, dates, and places of origin are often unknown.

Alÿs explained his interest in these widely produced replicas: 'It made me question the status of an icon. What is an icon? Is an icon defined by official art history? Or is an icon defined by, in this case, what seems to be an amateur painter's obsession with a particular image?'

24 Fabiolas were first exhibited in 1994 at the Mexico City's cultural initiative Curare: espacio crítico para las artes. In 1997, 60 of them were exhibited at London's Whitechapel Art Gallery. Between 2007 and 2018 they were exhibited at the following venues: Dia Art Foundation at The Hispanic Society of America, New York; Los Angeles County Museum of Art (LACMA) ; National Portrait Gallery, London; Monasterio de Santo Domingo de Silos, Burgos, Spain (organized by Museo Nacional Centro de Arte Reina Sofía, Madrid); Haus sum Kirschgarten, Basel (organized by Schaulager); Museo de Arte de Lima; Museo Amparo, Puebla, Mexico; Pinacoteca do Estado de Sao Paulo; Museo de Arte de Zapopan, Guadalajara, Mexico. Its latest presentation was at the Byzantine Fresco Chapel of the Menil Collection in Houston and by then the collection had grown to include 514 copies of the original portrait.

Recent projects 
Between 2010 and 2014, Alÿs traveled extensively to Afghanistan following his invitation to participate in dOCUMENTA(13). In collaboration with Julien Devaux and Ajmal Maiwandi, he produced Reel-Unreel (2011), a 20 min film. The camera follows two young Afghan boys as they chase the reel rolling down the hills of Kabul, with one boy unrolling the strip of film and leading the way, while another follows him, rewinding it. The title Reel-Unreel alludes to the real/unreal image of Afghanistan conveyed by the media in the West: how the Afghan way of life, along with its people, has gradually been dehumanized and, after decades of war, turned into a Western fiction. In 2013, he served as an embedded war artist with the UK's Task Force in the province of Helmand (Adrenalotourism, 2013).

Originally invited by the Baghdad-based Ruya Foundation to do a project in Yezidi refugee camps, Alÿs' main focus of production from 2015 to 2020 took place in Iraq. As war artist again he accompanied a Peshmerga battalion during the Kurdish offensive to free Mosul from the Islamic state of occupation. In that region Alÿs has also developed projects such as Hopscotch (2016), produced in collaboration with the Yazidi Refugee Camp of Sharya, Duhok, Iraq; Color Matching (2016), filmed during his embed with Kurdish forces; Salam Tristesse (2018) produced in collaboration with the Yazidi Refugee Camp of Kabarto and lastly Sandlines, the Story of History (2020), a feature film where the children of a mountain village near Mosul reenact a century of Iraqi history, from the secret agreement of Sykes/Picot signed in 1916 to the realm of terror established by the Islamic State in 2016. Sandlines premiered in 2020 at festivals like Sundance, the International Film Festival Rotterdam, and Mexico City's Ficunam.

Alÿs continues to add to his long running film series Children's Games (1999–present) which has amassed over 20 videos of children playing varies games in places in Afghanistan, Iraq, Mexico, Europe, and Hong Kong. The series reflects the artists habit of 'making contact' with a completely different culture by seeing and filming how kids play.

Exhibitions and recognition 
The artist's work was the subject of major surveys like A Story of Deception, which was on view from 2010 to 2011 at Tate Modern, London; Wiels Centre d'Art Contemporain, Brussels; and The Museum of Modern Art, New York and MoMA PS1, Long Island City, New York; or A Story of Negotiation, which traveled between 2015 and 2017 from Museo Tamayo Arte Contemporáneo, Mexico City, to Museo de Arte Latinoamericano de Buenos Aires (MALBA) – Fundación Costantini, Buenos Aires; Museo Nacional de Bellas Artes de la Habana, Havana; and Art Gallery of Ontario, Toronto.

Over the past decade, he has had several solo exhibitions at prominent venues, including the Rockbund Art Museum (RAM), Shanghai (2018); Art Sonje Center, Seoul (2018); Museum of Contemporary Art, Tokyo (traveled to the Hiroshima City Museum of Contemporary Art, both 2013); Irish Museum of Modern Art, Dublin (2010); The Renaissance Society at the University of Chicago (2008); Hammer Museum, Los Angeles (2007); Hirshhorn Museum and Sculpture Garden, Washington, DC (2006); and Portikus, Frankfurt (2006). Alÿs participated in the Venice Biennial in 1999, 2001, 2007 and 2017, and the Carnegie International in 2004.

He has been awarded the Blue Orange prize in 2004, the Vincent Award in 2008, the BACA-laureate prize in 2010, the EYE Art & Film Prize from EYE Filmmuseum in 2018, and in 2020 the Whitechapel Gallery Art Icon Award and the Rolf Schock Prize in Visual Arts. Francis Alÿs will represent Belgium at the 2022 Venice Biennale. He was among the names in Blake Gopnik's 2011 list "The 10 Most Important Artists of Today", with Gopnik arguing that his art stands for "being alive and striving to do anything in a universe that grinds all efforts to dust."
In 2013, Dale Eisinger of Complex ranked Re-Enactment 10th in his list of the greatest performance art works, saying that it "seems to carry more personal risk as well heavier social critique [sic]" than the better-known When Faith Moves Mountains.

Selected Bibliography 

 2004. Francis Alÿs: The Modern Procession. Texts by Francis Alÿs, Lynne Cooke, Alejandro Diaz, Tom Eccles, Dario Gamboni, RoseLee Goldberg, Laurence Kardish, Harper Montgomery, and Francesco Pellizzi. Interview with the artist by Tom Eccles and Robert Storr. Public Art Fund, New York
 2005.  When Faith Moves Mountains/Cuando la fe mueve montañas. Texts by Susan Buck Morss, Gustavo Buntinx, Lynne Cooke, Corinne Diserens, Cuauhtémoc Medina, and Gerardo Mosquera. Turner, Madrid
 2006. Francis Alÿs: The Historic Centre of Mexico City. Text by Carlos Monsiváis. Turner, Madrid
 2006. Diez cuadras alrededor del estudio, Antiguo Colegio de San Ildefonso, Mexico City
 2006. Francis Alÿs: A Story of Deception - Patagonien 2003-2006. Texts by Francis Alÿs and Olivier Debroise. Revolver, Frankfurt (exh. cat.)
 2007. Francis Alÿs: Politics of Rehearsal. Text by Russell Ferguson. Steidl, Göttingen, Germany and Hammer Museum, Los Angeles (exh. cat.)
 2010. In A Given Situation/Numa Dada Situação. Texts by Ton Marar, Cuauhtémoc Medina, and Alfonso Reyes. Cosac Naify, São Paulo
 2010. Francis Alÿs: A Story of Deception. Edited by Mark Godfrey, Klaus Biesenbach, and Kerryn Greenberg. Texts by Eduardo Abaroa, Francesco Careri, T.J. Demos, Carla Faesler, Laymert Garcia dos Santos, Mark Godfrey, Boris Groys, Miwon Kwon, Tom McDonough, Lorna Scott Fox, Eyal Weizman, et al. Tate Publishing, London (exh. cat.)
 2011. Sign Painting Project. Edited by Theodora Vischer. Texts by Francis Alÿs, Néstor García Canclini, Monika Kästli, and Cuauhtémoc Medina. Steidl, Göttingen, Germany and Schaulager, Basel
 2013. Francis Alÿs: schilder van luchtspiegelingen. Text by Paul de Moor. Ludion, Antwerp
 2013. Don't Cross the Bridge Before You Get to the River. Texts by Yukie Kamiya and Kazuhiko Yoshizaki. Seigensha Art Publishing, Kyoto (exh. cat.)
 2014. Francis Alÿs: REEL-UNREEL. Edited by Andrea Viliani. Texts by Francis Alÿs, Carolyn Christov-Bakargiev, Mario García Torres, Mariam Ghani, Ewa Gorządek, Ajmal Maiwandi, Amanullah Mojadidi, Robert Slifkin, and Michael Taussig. Interview with the artist by Ajmal Maiwandi and Andrea Viliani. Museo d'Arte Contemporanea Donnaregina Napoli (MADRE), Naples and Centre for Contemporary Art Ujazdowski Castle, Warsaw (exh. cat.)
 2015. Relato de una negociación: pintura y acción en la obra de Francis Alÿs/A Story of Negotiation: Painting and Action in the Work of Francis Alÿs, Museo Tamayo Arte Contemporáneo, Mexico City (exh. cat.)
 2016. Le temps du sommeil. Texts by Francis Alÿs and Catherine Lampert. Secession, Vienna
2018. Knots'n Dust: Francis Alÿs. Text by Marie Muracciole. Les Presses du réel, Dijon
 2019. Francis Alÿs: La dépense, Rockbund Art Museum, Shanghai (exh. cat.)

Francis Alÿs is represented by David Zwirner in New York, Galerie Peter Kilchmann in Zurich, and Jan Mot in Brussels.

References

External links 
 http://francisalys.com/ Artist's official website
 Francis Alÿs at the Museum of Modern Art
 Lynne Cooke's essay on Fabiola, 2008
 Review of Revolution VS Revolution, Beirut Art Center, 2012 
 Sacha Guedj-Cohen's interview with Francis Alÿs and Julien Devaux about Sandlines, the Story of History, "Francis Alÿs. Between Fiction and Reality", artpress, issue 479 (July-August 2020)]
 Michele Robecchi's interview with Francis Alÿs, Contemporary, issue 78 (2005)
 Mark Godfrey, TJ Demos, Eyal Weizman, Ayesha Hameed: "Rights of Passage." Tate etc. issue 19 (2010)
 Francis Alÿs' profile at Kadist Art Foundation

1959 births
Living people
Walking artists
Artists from Antwerp
Belgian contemporary artists
Belgian emigrants to Mexico
Mexican contemporary artists